Crosseyed Heart is the third solo album by Rolling Stones guitarist Keith Richards. Released on 18 September 2015, it is Richards' first studio album in 23 years since Main Offender. As with his first two albums, it was recorded with his band the X-Pensive Winos.

The first single from the album, "Trouble", was released on 17 July 2015, prior to the album's release.

Critical reception

Crosseyed Heart was met with positive reviews from music critics. At Metacritic, which assigns a normalized rating out of 100 to reviews from mainstream critics, the album has received an average score of 76, based on 19 reviews, indicating "generally favourable reviews". Robert Christgau wrote, "it sounds like some kind of Honorable Mention--songwriting deliberately generic."

Track listing

Personnel
The X-Pensive Winos
Keith Richards – lead vocals (1–15), acoustic guitar (1–8, 10–14), bass (2, 3, 5–10, 14, 15), electric guitar (2, 3, 5–12, 14, 15), piano (2–4, 8–12), backing vocals (3, 5, 14, 15), keyboards (6), electric sitar (8), Wurlitzer (8), Farfisa (8, 11), tiple (12)
Waddy Wachtel – electric guitar (2, 5, 8, 10), acoustic guitar (8), backing vocals (8), slide guitar (14)
Steve Jordan – drums (2–15), backing vocals (2–7, 9–15), percussion (5, 6), piano (6), congas (7) vibes (11), timpani (11), horn arrangement (15)
Bobby Keys – saxophone (3, 9)
Ivan Neville – Hammond organ (6), backing vocals (6), Wurlitzer (15)
Babi Floyd – backup vocals (11)
Sarah Dash – backing vocals (14)

Additional musicians

Norah Jones – co-lead vocals (11)
Bernard Fowler – backing vocals (5, 6, 11–13, 15)
Larry Campbell – violin (2), pedal steel guitar (2, 4), fiddle (12)
Meegan Voss – backing vocals (3, 8)
Paul Nowinski – bass (4), viola (12), gamba (12)
Kevin Batchelor – trumpet (6)
Clifton Anderson – trombone (6)
Charles Dougherty – tenor saxophone (6)
Aaron Neville – backing vocals (7)
Charles Hodges – Hammond organ (7, 10, 14), piano (10)
 David Paich – Farfisa organ (8)
Harlem Gospel Choir – backing vocals (10)
Pino Palladino – bass (11)
Blondie Chaplin – backing vocals (11–13, 15)
Pierre DeBeauport – acoustic guitar (14)
Ben Cauley – trumpet (15)
Spooner Oldham – Hammond organ (15)
Jack Hale – trombone (15)
Lannie McMillan – tenor saxophone (15)
Jim Horn – baritone saxophone (15)
Lester Snell – horn arrangement (15)

Charts

Weekly charts

Year-end charts

References

2015 albums
Republic Records albums
Keith Richards albums